Mojave National Preserve is a United States National Preserve located in the Mojave Desert of San Bernardino County, California, USA, between Interstate 15 and Interstate 40. The preserve was established October 31, 1994, with the passage of the California Desert Protection Act by the US Congress, which also established Joshua Tree National Park and Death Valley National Park as National Parks. Previously, some lands contained within the Preserve were the East Mojave National Scenic Area, under the jurisdiction of the Bureau of Land Management. At , within the contiguous United States it is the third largest unit of the National Park System and the first largest National Preserve. The preserve was created within the Pacific West Region of the National Park Service and remains within that jurisdiction today.

Natural features include the Kelso Dunes, the Marl Mountains and the Cima Dome, as well as volcanic formations such as Hole-in-the-Wall and the Cinder Cone Lava Beds. The preserve surrounds Providence Mountains State Recreation Area and Mitchell Caverns Natural Preserve, which are both managed by the California Department of Parks and Recreation.

Impressive Joshua tree forests are found in parts of the preserve. The forest covering Cima Dome and the adjacent Shadow Valley is the largest and densest in the world. In August 2020 a wildfire destroyed 1.3 million Joshua Trees around Cima Dome. The ghost town of Kelso is found in the preserve, with the defunct railroad depot serving as the Visitor Center. The preserve is commonly traversed by 4 wheel drive vehicles traveling on the historic Mojave Road.

Climate in the preserve varies greatly. Summer temperatures average , with highs exceeding . Annual precipitation varies from  near Baker, to almost  in the mountains. At least 25% of precipitation comes from summer thunderstorms. Snow is often found in the mountains during the winter.

The preserve currently faces challenges based on its lack of funding, as of 2018 the preserve had a deferred maintenance of $118,036,341. This lack of funding has primarily lead to infrastructure disrepair which, in combination with the reckless driving prevalent among visitors, has caused a significant threat to the endangered Desert Tortoise population within the preserve. In addition to the tortoise's threatened population, the Prairie Falcon and the Bighorn Sheep are both at a risk within the preserve. A common solution provided to help save this population is to install wildlife crossings over the main roads within the preserve, though this is currently not possible with the funding provided.

Mojave Wilderness
The National Park Service manages the wilderness in accordance with the Wilderness Act, the CDPA, and other laws that protect cultural and historic sites in the wilderness.

Administrative history 
Upon the preserve's establishment, Mary Martin was designated as its superintendent, she served from 1994 to 2005, when she was moved to the Lassen Volcanic National Park. Dennish Schramm then served from 2005 to 2010. Stephanie Dubois served from 2010 to 2014. Todd Suess served from 2014 to 2020, though he continues to work for the National Park Service as the Chief of Biological Resources. The current superintendent is Mike Gauthier who has served since 2020.

Features

 Beale Mountains
 Cima, California
 Cima Dome & Volcanic Field National Natural Landmark
 Clark Mountain
 Devils Playground
 Granite Mountains
 Ivanpah, California
 Ivanpah Mountains
 Kelso, California
 Kelso Depot
 Kelso Dunes
 Kelso Mountains
 Kelso Wash
 Lanfair Valley
 Marl Mountains
 Mid Hills
 Mojave phone booth
 Mojave Road
 New York Mountains
 Old Dad Mountain
 Providence, California
 Providence Mountains
 Vanderbilt, California
 Vontrigger Hills

Climate
 
The following climate data is for a higher elevation area in the preserve. See also Climate of the Mojave Desert.

See also
 Mojave Memorial Cross

References

External links 

 
 Photo tour of Mojave National Preserve - from USGS
 Mojave National Preserve Conservancy 
 Mojave Desert Land Trust

 
Mojave Desert
National Preserves of the United States
Protected areas of the Mojave Desert
Protected areas of San Bernardino County, California
Protected areas established in 1994
National Park Service areas in California
Geography of San Bernardino County, California
Nature reserves in California
1994 establishments in California